Varol is both a given name and a surname. Notable people with the name include:

Güven Varol (born 1981), Turkish footballer
Ozan Varol (born 1981), author and professor
Varol Akman (born 1957), Turkish academic
Varol Ürkmez (1937–2021), Turkish footballer

de:Varol